Michael Margolies, an American entrepreneur, and investor founded Littlebanc Advisors, LLC, a private equity firm that invests in enduring businesses such as logistics, firearms,  deathcare, and broadband. Margolies played a crucial role in funding and institutionalizing companies like LBMH:, LMLP:, and PLPM:, resulting in successful exits. He also led the A round for Acorns, which has raised around $100 million in venture capital funding and attracted notable investors like Jennifer Lopez and Alex Rodriguez and institutions like PayPal and BlackRock. According to recent SEC filings, Margolies's family office is the lead investor in ETF company Nightshares and fintech company Intellpro. Additionally, he led the A round in crypto asset manager Arca.  Most recently, Littlebanc invested in CAL.NET, the 11th largest wireless internet provider in the US.

Early life 
Michael Margolies was born on July 4, 1958, in Far Rockaway of the New York City borough of Queens to parents Carl and Sandy Margolies. As a child, he showed an early proclivity for business selling souvenirs on Rockaway Beach during the summer and working at local businesses during the winter. He attended Far Rockaway High School, where he was an accomplished football player and captain of his team. He graduated in 1977.

Career 
Forgoing college, Margolies took a job as a truck driver delivering beer to restaurants and bars in Harlem. Later, after deciding to pursue his aptitude for business, Margolies began his career in the health club industry as a salesperson. By 1980, he was one of the top salesmen for the health club chain, Jack Lalanne. In 1982, he landed a job as a clerk on the floor of Wall Street's New York Stock Exchange. He continued to excel and hold jobs at various Wall Street institutions for the next 16 years and has more than 30 years of Wall Street experience, during which he was partner at Oppenheimer for about 8 years. 

Throughout his career, he has had the advantage of holding positions in the private and public sector as both a principal and an agent. He was considered to be a pioneer of the “CIA” approach to Wall Street research, which utilized former FBI, and CIA investigators teamed with forensic accountants and lawyers to examine fundamental business viability. His many successes and style of research helped him to forge relationships with some of the most significant hedge and mutual funds of the day. He was also responsible for many very profitable and controversial short positions in his career, including ImClone Systems, H&R Block, Metris, Cell Pathways, and many others during the dot-com era.

As a pioneer in independent research for Wall Street companies, he is commonly recognized as the founder and CEO of the independent research provider Avalon Research Group Inc. (1995–2004). In 2011, Margolies was cited as a "must-know" business influencer by the Jacksonville Advantage for his extensive experience and relationships with Wall Street's well-known investors. He has been regularly interviewed and featured in Barron's and other publications over the years. Margolies has also been a guest lecturer at some of the nation's top business schools (UVA Darden School of Business, Columbia, Stanford) and sits on many boards.

After selling Avalon Research to Metal Bulletin in 2005, Margolies took a few years off before founding Littlebanc. Littlebanc is a modern-day merchant bank focused on smaller companies. 
Littlebanc had success in Liberator Medical Planet Payment and LML payments.  Littlebanc currently has investments in logistics firearms deathcare and e-commerce software.

Personal life 
Margolies had two children with his first wife, Cheryl. They divorced amicably in April 2008 after 23 years of marriage. He married his second wife, Kathleen Whitledge, in 2010. Margolies has 7 children, Chelsea, Camden, Mikayla, Oliver, Sebastian, Benjamin, and Theodore.

References

External links 

 Littlebanc
 
 
 
 
 
 
 
 
 
 
 
 
 
 
 
 
 
 
 
 
 
 
 

1958 births
Living people
American financial company founders
American financial businesspeople
Far Rockaway High School alumni
People from Queens, New York
American chief executives